Louvencourt is a commune in the Somme department in Hauts-de-France in northern France. Vera Brittain's fiancée Roland Leighton is buried in the Louvencourt commonwealth war cemetery

Geography

Population

See also
Communes of the Somme department

References

Communes of Somme (department)